Edward Holmes (1797 – 28 August 1859) was an English musicologist, music critic, pianist, and music educator. Born just outside London, he was a pupil of Vincent Novello. He spent his early career earning a living as a piano teacher. In 1827 he visited Germany, and upon returning to England published his first book, A Ramble among the Musicians of Germany (1828; 3d ed., 1838). Impressed with his skills as a writer on music, the owner of The Atlas hired him as a music critic where he remained for many years. In 1849 he immigrated to the United States where he spent the last ten years of his life working as an editor and music critic. He also contributed articles to several music journals during his career, including The Musical Times. His other works include The Life of Mozart (1845), Life of Purcell, for Novello's Sacred Music, and Analytical and Thematic Index of Mozart's Piano-works.

References

Notes

1797 births
1859 deaths
English music critics
English musicologists
19th-century musicologists